Motorola Atrix is a brand name for Motorola phones.  These phones include:

 Motorola Atrix 4G
 Motorola Atrix 2
 Motorola Atrix HD